Guruwar Peth is an area located in Pune (Old) City, in Maharashtra State of the Republic of India.

Location

References

Peths in Pune